Banat Swabian ( and also known as ) is a local German dialect spoken in Banat, present-day southwestern Romania by the Banat Swabians, an ethnic German sub-group which is part of the larger German minority of Romania and a branch of the Danube Swabians respectively. In comparative linguistics, it is a West Central German dialect and it also has some features which correspond to Hessian dialects.

Background 

When they arrived in Banat during the Modern Age, most of the initial Banat Swabian colonists were not from the historical German region of Swabia. They also came from other regions of present-day Germany and even from Luxembourg. Therefore, the dialect of the Banat Swabians is a West Central German dialect which is part of the Moselle-Franconian family and thereby shares several linguistic similarities with another German dialect spoken in Romania, namely Transylvanian Saxon as well as with Luxembourgish from which the latter is mainly descended. In addition, Banat Swabian is also closer to Palatine German or other Rhenish Franconian dialects such as that spoken in Saarland (i.e. Saarländisch).

Hence, only Sathmar Swabian is an actual Alemannic German Swabian dialect, whereas Banat Swabian is closer to Palatine German. It also has words from Romanian and Serbian, being influenced by these two languages given the centuries-long cohabitation between the Germans with Romanians and Serbians in Banat. It is locally known as Schwowisch in Bačka, Serbia.

Notes

References 

Banat
Languages of Romania
German dialects
Danube Swabian communities